Ankara is a Turkish province divided into three electoral districts of the Grand National Assembly of Turkey. It elects thirty-six members of parliament (deputies) to represent the province of the same name for a four-year term by the D'Hondt method, a party-list proportional representation system.

Members 
Population reviews of each electoral district are conducted before each general election, which can lead to certain districts being granted a smaller or greater number of parliamentary seats. Ankara is the second largest province in Turkey and saw an increase in its seat allocation ahead of the 2011 election to 31 members, with the first district electing 16 MPs while the second district electing 15 MPs per district.

The province's administrative districts (ilçe) are divided among two electoral districts as follows:

General elections

2011

June 2015

November 2015

2018

Presidential elections

2014

References 

Politics of Ankara Province